Michael Ronald Meadows (born 11 September 1987 in Oxford) is a British racing driver. He is a two-time champion in Porsche Carrera Cup GB and won the 2018 Blancpain GT Series Sprint Cup alongside Raffaele Marciello.

Career
In 2012 and 2013, he became the overall champion in Porsche Carrera Cup Great Britain. For the past five years, he has finished in the top two. In 2014, Meadows won more races than Josh Webster, but Webster's greater consistency allowed him to take the overall championship by nine points, ahead of the two-time defending champion Meadows. In 2015, he was beaten by Daniel Cammish, the ex-champion in British Formula Ford. In the ten years he has raced, Meadows has notched up 31 career wins.

Meadows made his debut racing in the 2005 Formula BMW UK series. As well as this, he has appeared in Porsche Supercup, International Formula Master, Blancpain Endurance Series and the British GT Championship.

Personal life
He was born in Oxford, Oxfordshire but now lives in London.

Racing record

Complete Blancpain GT Series Sprint Cup results

References

External links
 
 

1987 births
Living people
Sportspeople from Oxford
English racing drivers
Formula BMW UK drivers
British Formula Renault 2.0 drivers
International Formula Master drivers
British Formula Three Championship drivers
British GT Championship drivers
Porsche Supercup drivers
Blancpain Endurance Series drivers
European Le Mans Series drivers
Porsche Carrera Cup GB drivers
International GT Open drivers
Mercedes-AMG Motorsport drivers
W Racing Team drivers
SMP Racing drivers
CRS Racing drivers
Euronova Racing drivers